Hanna Carolina Ljungberg (born 8 January 1979) is a Swedish former football player, who played the position of forward. She played for the club side Umeå IK and for the Swedish national football team. She debuted for Sweden, at age 17, on 6 February 1996, when Sweden won 8-0 against Spain.

Ljungberg can be seen in the Sveriges Television documentary television series The Other Sport from 2013.

Career

Hanna Ljungberg was one of several professional players in the Swedish women's league, Damallsvenskan. She was chosen as Swedish Player of the Year in 2002, winning the Diamond Ball (Diamantbollen). She also scored a record setting number of goals that season with 39 goals (roughly 1.78 goals per game). Ljungberg made altogether 227 league appearances for Umeå IK and scored 196 goals.

As a world class forward, Ljungberg was instrumental in the Swedish side that were runners up in the FIFA Women's World Cup 2003 held in the United States, scoring three goals and assisting another. She was also voted 3rd best World Player of the Year by FIFA in 2003. Until October 2014 when she was surpassed by Lotta Schelin, Ljungberg was the goal leader of the Swedish national team with 72 goals. During the UEFA Women's Cup 2002-03, Ljungberg was the top goalscorer in the tournament with 10 goals. Italian men's football club Perugia contacted Ljungberg to hire her for their Serie A roster, but the deal aborted.

She debuted as a goalkeeper on 17 May 2007 for Umeå IK when they played against AIK in the Swedish Cup because of Carola Söberg's injury at the 70th minute. She ended the game with a clean sheet. Her fame in Sweden has led to stamps commemorating her and several other Swedish footballers for the Swedish Football Association's 100th anniversary.

In August 2009 Ljungberg announced her retirement from football after a knee injury in a league match on 5 July. The right anterior cruciate ligament, previously reconstructed in 2004, was again partly torn and she decided with her doctors that to continue to play presented too high a risk of permanent disability.

For two years Ljungberg helped Joakim Blomqvist, head coach of Umeå IK, and Maria Bergkvist assistant coach, in the coaching of her old team. At the same time she was studying at Umeå University to become a physiotherapist and graduated in June 2012. She then began a new career as a personal trainer.

Matches and goals scored at World Cup & Olympic tournaments 
Hanna Ljungberg featured for Sweden in three World Cups (USA 1999, USA 2003, China 2007) and three Olympic Games (Athens 1996, Sydney 2000, Athens 2004.) She scored Sweden's lone goal in the 2003 World Cup Final, where Sweden lost to Germany for a second place finish.

Matches and goals scored at European Championship tournaments
Hanna Ljungberg appeared at three European Championship tournaments: Norway/Sweden 1997, Germany 2001, and England 2005. In the 2005 Semi-Final, she scored twice against Norway, erasing Norwegian leads each time. Her second goal in the 89th minute knotted the score at 2-2 and forced extra time. Sweden could not find a match winner though, and exited the tournament in a 2-3 defeat.

Honours

Club 
Umeå
Damallsvenskan:
 Champion (7): 2000, 2001, 2002, 2005, 2006, 2007, 2008

Svenska Cupen Damer:
 Champion (4): 2001, 2002, 2003, 2007
 Runner-up (2): 2005 ,2006

Supercupen:
 Champion (2): 2007, 2008
 Runner-up (1): 2009

UEFA Women's Cup:
 Champion (1): 2003
 Runner-up (3): 2002, 2007, 2008

International 
Sweden
FIFA Women's World Cup:
 Runner-up (1): 2003

Algarve Cup:
 Champion (1): 2001

Individual 

Diamond Ball (1):
 2001–02

Sweden: Female Forward of the Year (1):
 2004–05

Damallsvenskan Top Goalscorer (1):
 2001–02 (39 goals)

FIFA World Player of the Year:
 Third place: 2002–03

References

External links

 Club Profile (in Swedish)
 Ljungberg and Svensson 
 National Team Profile

1979 births
Living people
Sportspeople from Umeå
Swedish women's footballers
Damallsvenskan players
Sunnanå SK players
Umeå IK players
Sweden women's international footballers
Footballers at the 1996 Summer Olympics
Footballers at the 2000 Summer Olympics
Footballers at the 2004 Summer Olympics
Olympic footballers of Sweden
1999 FIFA Women's World Cup players
2003 FIFA Women's World Cup players
2007 FIFA Women's World Cup players
FIFA Century Club
Umeå University alumni
Women's association football forwards